The 1864 United States presidential election in Connecticut took place on November 8, 1864, as part of the 1864 United States presidential election. Voters chose six representatives, or electors to the Electoral College, who voted for president and vice president.

Connecticut voted for the National Union candidate, Abraham Lincoln, over the Democratic candidate, George B. McClellan. Lincoln won the state by a narrow margin of 2.76%.

Results

See also
 United States presidential elections in Connecticut

References

Connecticut
1864
1864 Connecticut elections